Klopina is a municipality and village in Šumperk District in the Olomouc Region of the Czech Republic. It has about 600 inhabitants.

Administrative parts
The village of Veleboř is an administrative part of Klopina.

History
The first written mention of Klopina is from 1366.

References

Villages in Šumperk District